The Choir of Man is a British musical created by Nic Doodson and Andrew Kay. Set in a traditional British or Irish pub, the show features a working on-stage bar from which pints of beer are poured for the audience during the performance. Throughout the show, the cast of nine multi-instrumentalist singers perform arrangements of well-known Pop and Rock music arranged and orchestrated by the show's Musical Supervisor Jack Blume, while dialogue takes the form of spoken word monologues written by performance poet Ben Norris. The movement direction and choreography is by tap dancer Freddie Huddleston.

The show was first presented at the Edinburgh Fringe Festival in 2017, and has since had seasons at venues around the world, including the Sydney Opera House and the John F. Kennedy Center for the Performing Arts. The Choir of Man made its West End debut at the Arts Theatre on 29 October 2021, with the run later extended due to popular demand. After receiving a nomination for the Olivier Award for Best Entertainment or Comedy Play in 2022, the show announced it would be returning to the Arts Theatre in October 2022.

Since 2018, The Choir of Man has been a resident show on board the Norwegian Escape and Norwegian Encore cruise ships.

Background 
After working together since 2014 on the production of A Cappella music stage show Gobsmacked!, in 2016 Nic Doodson and Andrew Kay came up with the idea for a show about 'normal men', who sing in their local pub's choir. Having co-created Gobsmacked! with Doodson, Jack Blume was brought on board as the show's musical arranger. Soon afterwards Freddie Huddleston, who had previously worked with Blume on a workshop project, joined the creative team as the choreographer and movement director. The show's premiere season was at the 2017 Edinburgh Festival Fringe, in the Assembly Rooms Music Hall on Princes Street. The original cast included actor and poetry slam champion Ben Norris. During development workshops for the show, Doodson asked Norris to write some poetic monologues to help transition between songs. These segments became a defining part of the show's tone and character, and were gradually woven throughout the production.

Production History

Edinburgh Fringe Festival (2017) 
The premiere season of The Choir of Man, at the Assembly Music Hall in August 2017. The original cast included John Sheehy, Aidan Banyard, Mark Loveday, Tom Brandon, Jami Reid-Quarrell, Ben Norris, Freddie Huddleston, Peter Lawrence and Andrew Carter. This version did not include the role of a virtuoso pianist.

Adelaide Fringe Festival (2018) 
Taking place at the Adelaide Fringe Festival's Gluttony site in the Flamingo tent, the show's second outing had a few changes of repertoire, new monologues, and with the addition of Connor Going to the cast, was debut of the virtuoso pianist role. In Week 2 of the festival, The Choir of Man won the Bank SA "Best Music" award. At the end of the season, The Choir of Man won the Bank SA overall "Pick of the Fringe" award.

Norwegian Cruise Lines 
After its success at the 2017 Edinburgh Fringe Festival, The Choir of Man was licensed for performance at sea by Norwegian Cruise lines, making its debut on the NCL Escape in 2018, and subsequently opening on board the brand new Norwegian Encore in 2019. During the COVID-19 pandemic whilst theatres and cruise lines around the world were shut down, The Choir of Man filmed a special "Live From London" performance in the empty Garrick Theatre, for NCL's EMBARK series. This hour long special featured interviews with cast members cut into a socially-distanced concert performance of songs from the show, performed on the empty Garrick stage.

References 

Jukebox musicals
2017 musicals
West End musicals
Norwegian Cruise Line